This is a list of notable people who were either born in, lived in or are closely associated with Greensboro, North Carolina and have an article on Wikipedia.

A–E
Ethan Albright, NFL Pro Bowl long snapper, played for University of North Carolina and NFL's Miami Dolphins, Buffalo Bills, and Washington Redskins
Keenan Allen, NFL Pro Bowl wide receiver for the Los Angeles Chargers
Tom Alston, former Major League Baseball first baseman and first African-American to play for the St. Louis Cardinals
Samuel E. Anderson, United States Air Force Four Star General; commanded Fifth Air Force during the Korean War
Clarence Avant, entertainment industry agent, entrepreneur, mogul
Fantasia Barrino, winner of American Idol season three and Grammy Award-winning R&B singer, briefly lived in Greensboro and is from nearby High Point
Thomas Berry, ecology spokesman
Rex M. Best, Emmy Award-winning writer for the CBS daytime dramas The Young and the Restless and The Bold and the Beautiful
Jeff Bostic, NFL offensive lineman for the Washington Redskins
Joe Bostic, NFL offensive lineman  for the St. Louis (later Arizona) Cardinals
Michael Brooks, NFL defensive back
Hal "Skinny" Brown, MLB pitcher, member of Baltimore Orioles Hall of Fame 
Tony Brown, record producer
Joseph M. Bryan, businessman and philanthropist, lived in Greensboro until his death in 1995
Frances Webb Bumpass, newspaper publisher
Lamont Burns, NFL offensive lineman
Sharon Raiford Bush, American television's first African-American female weather anchor of primetime news, in 1975 at WGPR-TV, the world's first black-owned-and-operated television station
Gianluca Busio, Major League Soccer player
Andy Cabic, of indie folk band Vetiver; lived in Greensboro while a member of indie-rock band The Raymond Brake
Orson Scott Card, author, journalist and professor; several of his books, including Ender's Game and Shadow Puppets feature settings in and around Greensboro
Jimmy Carpenter, American electric blues saxophonist, singer, songwriter, arranger and record producer
Eugene Chadbourne, composer and musician
Spencer Chamberlain, lead vocalist of the band Underoath, was raised in Greensboro
Joey Cheek, Olympic gold-medal speed skater
Howard Coble, former member of U.S. House of Representatives (6th District, N.C.)
Levi Coffin, Quaker educator and abolitionist
Tarik Cohen, NFL player, attended North Carolina A&T State University
Billy "Crash" Craddock, country music singer, born and lives near Greensboro
Chris Daughtry, American Idol contestant
Jeff Davis, NFL player for Tampa Bay Buccaneers and member of Clemson's 1981 national championship team; attended Dudley High School
Rick Dees, radio personality; graduated from Grimsley High School
Louis DeJoy, current Postmaster of the United States of America and major Republican Party benefactor
Marques Douglas, NFL player
James Lamont DuBose, executive television and film producer, BET
Eric Ebron, NFL tight end; attended Ben L. Smith High School
Donna Edmondson, 1987 Playboy Playmate of the year
Vince Evans, NFL quarterback and 1977 Rose Bowl most valuable player

F–J
Barry Farber, radio talk show host, author and language-learning enthusiast; born in Greensboro, and graduated from Greensboro Senior High School (see Grimsley High School)
Tal Farlow, pioneering jazz guitarist
Wes Ferrell, MLB pitcher 1927–41, two-time All-Star
Henry Flynt (b. 1940), philosopher, avant-garde musician, anti-art activist and exhibited artist often associated with Conceptual Art, Fluxus and Nihilism
Charles Foster, Olympic track hurdler
Inez and Charlie Foxx, rhythm-and-blues and soul duo known for the 1963 hit "Mockingbird"
Golda Fried, novelist and poet
Michimasa Fujino, President and CEO of Honda Aircraft Company
Rhiannon Giddens, singer-songwriter and multi-instrumentalist, co-founder of the Carolina Chocolate Drops
Edwin Forbes Glenn, United States Army officer
David Hickman, United States Army, War In Iraq
Dino Hackett, NFL linebacker; has jersey number retired by Appalachian State
Joey Hackett, NFL tight end
Kay Hagan, former U.S. Senator
PJ Hairston, played college basketball for North Carolina Tar Heels, 26th pick in the 2014 NBA Draft by Charlotte Hornets, now plays for Rio Grande Valley Vipers of the NBA Development League
Brendan Haywood, NBA player for Dallas Mavericks, attended Dudley High School
O. Henry, short-story writer.
John Henson, NBA player for the Cleveland Cavaliers
Matt Hill, electric blues guitarist, singer and songwriter
Terrence Holt, NFL safety, played for NC State and Detroit Lions; born in nearby Gibsonville along with his brother Torry Holt
Torry Holt, wide receiver for NC State and All-Pro for the St. Louis Rams; born in nearby Gibsonville and attended Eastern Guilford High School
Lindsey Hopkins Jr., businessman, banker, investor, and sportsman
Lou Hudson, NBA All-Star
Chanita Hughes-Halbert, psychologist and medical researcher
Jim Hunt, former 69th and 71st Governor of North Carolina
John Inman, professional golfer who played on the PGA Tour
John Isner, professional tennis player
Jesse Jackson, civil rights activist, minister, politician, attended and graduated from North Carolina A&T University
Randall Jarrell, nationally acclaimed poet, professor at University of North Carolina at Greensboro until his death in 1965; buried near Guilford College campus
Haywood Jeffires, NFL Pro Bowl wide receiver for Houston Oilers and New Orleans Saints, coach of a Texas semi-pro team
Ken Jeong, actor, grew up in Greensboro, North Carolina and graduated from Page High School; starred in NBC sitcom Community
Dr. Frank Jobe, orthopedic surgeon, invented UCL reconstruction known as Tommy John surgery
Robert Elijah Jones, early African American Bishop in the Methodist Church

K–O
Paris Kea, All-American basketball player at the University of North Carolina Chapel Hill, WNBA player for the Indiana Fever
J. William Kime, Commandant of the U.S. Coast Guard 
Debra Lee, Chief Executive Officer of BET
John Anthony Lennon (b. 1950), composer
Janet Lilly, dancer, choreographer and professor at the University of North Carolina at Greensboro
Caroline Lind, Olympic rower and two-time gold medalist in the women's eight event
Ann Livermore, former Executive Vice President at Hewlett-Packard
Frank Lucas, infamous heroin dealer, subject of American Gangster film starring Denzel Washington
Loretta Lynch, Attorney General of the United States
Dolley Madison, First Lady and wife of President James Madison
Carolyn Maloney (née Carolyn Jane Bosher, born 1946), politician serving as U.S. Representative 
Danny Manning, an All-America basketball player for the University of Kansas and NBA star, attended Page High School in Greensboro
Doug Marlette, Pulitzer Prize-winning cartoonist
Margaret Maron, author of award-winning mystery novels
Joyce Martin Dixon, businesswoman and philanthropist
Jack F. Matlock, Jr., U.S. Ambassador to U.S.S.R., 1987–1991
Maryhelen Mayfield, ballet dancer and former artistic and executive director of Greensboro Ballet, lived in Greensboro
Bob McAdoo, NBA All-Star, college basketball All-American, and member of the Basketball Hall of Fame
Franklin McCain, one of The Greensboro Four, African-American student from North Carolina A&T State University who in 1960 started the first civil rights sit-in; action eventually led to lunch counters and restaurants being desegregated throughout the Southern United States; attended Dudley
Courtney McClellan, interdisciplinary artist
Adrian McDonnell, conductor living in France 
Mark McGuinn, country music artist
Joseph McNeil, one of the Greensboro Four, male African-American student from North Carolina A&T State University who in 1960 started the first civil rights sit-in; action eventually led to lunch counters and restaurants being desegregated throughout the Southern US
Beth Mitchell, competitive shag dancer
Jason Miyares, 48th Attorney General of Virginia
John Motley Morehead, 29th Governor of North Carolina
Emmanuel Moseley, NFL cornerback
Cedric Mullins, MLB player for the Baltimore Orioles
Edward R. Murrow, World War II CBS radio broadcaster and award-winning television journalist; born outside Greensboro
Fred "Curly" Neal, basketball player, Harlem Globetrotters
Ed Nelson, actor who played Dr. Michael Rossi on Peyton Place, spent last years in Greensboro and died there in 2014

P–T
Michael Parker, novelist
Clara J. Peck, public health nurse and hospital matron
Ronald Perelman, billionaire investor 
Garry Peterson, longtime drummer for the Guess Who
Carl Pettersson, Swedish PGA Tour player, graduated from Grimsley High School
Theo Pinson, NBA player for the Brooklyn Nets
Eddie Pope, soccer player for Real Salt Lake and the US National Soccer Team
Millard Powers, musician, songwriter, record producer, and Grammy-nominated recording engineer; member of Counting Crows
George Preddy, World War II fighter ace
Ethel Clay Price, nurse and socialite
Julian Price, insurance executive
Ricky Proehl, NFL player
Morgan Radford, journalist and reporter for NBC News and MSNBC
D.J. Reader, NFL Defensive Tackle
Eddie Robinson, Major League Soccer (MLS) player
Mark Robinson, 35th Lieutenant Governor of North Carolina
Lee Rouson, NFL running back, attended Page High School
Gregory Charles Royal, jazz musician from Duke EllingtonOrchestra, founder of New York Jazz Film Festival
Virginia Ragsdale, mathematician and creator of the Ragsdale conjecture
Ski Beatz, music producer
Charlie Sanders, member of Pro Football Hall of Fame and North Carolina Sports Hall of Fame, NFL tight end for Detroit Lions, attended Dudley High School
H.T. Kirby-Smith, author and poet
Nicholas Sparks, author
Wilbur Daniel Steele, author, playwright, Provincetown Players
Stanley Tanger, founder of Tanger Factory Outlet Centers
Edwin Teague, Olympic sports shooter
Sonny Terry, blues musician (1911–1986)
Whitney Way Thore, star of TLC's My Big Fat Fabulous Life

U–Z
Jan Van Dyke, dancer and choreographer, resided in Greensboro, taught at the University of North Carolina at Greensboro; pioneer for modern dance in Greensboro
Jeff Varner, Survivor contestant (Season 2)
Don Vaughan, former state senator and former member of the Greensboro City Council; helped obtain passage in 2010 of Susie's Law
Nancy Vaughan, 48th mayor of Greensboro
Robert Walden, pioneer NASCAR driver, lives near Greensboro
Cody Ware, NASCAR driver
Allen Webster, MLB pitcher
Gene White, NFL defensive back
Kelly Wigglesworth, Survivor contestant (Season 1)
Aldona Wos, physician and politician who has served in various positions at several U.S. government agencies and nonprofit organizations
Jerome Young, professional wrestler; born, lived, and died in Greensboro

References

External links

Greensboro-nc.gov
Greensboro Area Convention & Visitors Bureau

Greensboro, North Carolina